The vice president of the Government of New Caledonia is a political position in the Government of New Caledonia. According to the Nouméa Accord, the vice president in the collegial government system needs to come from a pro-independence party if the president comes from an anti-independence party and the other way round whenever the president comes from a pro-independence party.

List of officeholders

References

New Caledonia
Government of New Caledonia
Politics of New Caledonia